Chromosome 18 open reading frame 63 is a protein which in humans is encoded by the C18orf63 gene. This protein is not yet well understood by the scientific community. Research has been conducted suggesting that C18orf63 could be a potential biomarker for early stage pancreatic cancer and breast cancer.

Gene 
This gene is located at band 22, sub-band 3, on the long arm of chromosome 18.  It is composed of 5065 base pairs spanning from 74,315,875 to 74,359,187 bp on chromosome 18. The gene has a total of 14 exons.  C18orf63 is also known by the alias DKFZP78G0119. No isoforms exist for this gene.

Expression 
C18orf63 has high expression in the testis. The gene shows low expression in the kidneys, liver, lung, and pelvis. There is no phenotype associated with this gene.

Promoter 
The promoter region for C18orf63 is 1163 bp long starting at 74,314,813 bp and ending at 74,315,975 bp. The promoter ID is GXP_4417391. The presence of multiple y-box binding transcription factors and SRY transcription factor binding sites suggest that C18orf63 is involved in male sex determination.

Protein 

The C18orf63 protein is composed up of 685 amino acids and has a molecular weight of 77230.50 Da, with a predicted isoelectric point of 9.83.  No isoforms exist for this protein. This protein is rich in glutamine, isoleucine, lysine, and serine when compared to the average protein, but lacks in aspartic acid and glycine.

Structure 

In the predicted secondary structure for this protein there are a number of beta turns, beta strands and alpha helices. For C18orf63 48.6% of the protein is expected to form alpha helices and 28.6% of the structure is expected to be composed of beta strands.

Domains and Motifs 

The protein contains one domain of unknown function, DUF 4709, spanning from the 7th amino acid to the 280th amino acid. Motifs that are predicted to exist include an N-terminal motif, RxxL motif, and KEN conserving motif, which all signal for protein degradation. Another motif that is predicted to exist is a Wxxx motif, which facilitates entrance of PTS1 cargo proteins into the organellar lumen, and a RVxPx motif which allows protein transport from the trans-Golgi network to the plasma membrane of the cilia. There is also a bipartite nuclear localization signal at the end of the protein sequence. There is no trans-membrane domain present, indicating that C18orf63 is not a trans-membrane protein.

Post-Translational Modifications 
Post-translational modifications the protein is predicted to undergo include SUMOylation, PKC and CK2 phosphorylation, N-glycosylation, amiditation, and cleavage. There are six total PKC phosphorylation sites and 2 CK2 phosphorylation sites, 2 SUMOylation sites, and 2 N-glycosylation sites. There are no signal peptides present in this sequence.

Subcellular Location 
Due to the nuclear localization signal at the end of the protein sequence, C18orf63 is predicted to be nuclear. C18orf63 has also been predicted to be targeted to the mitochondria in addition to the nucleus.

Homology

Orhologs 
Orthologs have been found in most eukaryotes, with the exception of the class Amphibia. No human paralogs exist for C18orf63. The most distant homolog detectable is Mizuhopecten yessoensis, sharing a 37% identity with the human protein sequence. The domain of unknown function was the only homologous domain present in the protein sequence, it was found to be highly conserved in all orthologs. The table below shows some examples of various orthologs for this protein.

Rate of Evolution 
C18orf63 is a mildly slow evolving protein. The protein evolves faster than Cytochorme C but slower than Betaglobin.

Interacting proteins 
Transcription factors of interest predicted to bind to the regulatory sequence include p53 tumor suppressors, SRY testis determining factors, Y-box binding transcription factors, and glucocorticoid responsive elements. The JUN protein was found to interact with C18orf63 through antibait co-immunoprecipitation. The JUN protein binds to the USP28 promoter in colorectal cancer cells and is involved in the activation of these cancer cells.

Clinical significance

Mutations 
A variety of missense mutations occur in the human population for this protein. In the regulatory sequence missense mutations occur at two transcription factor binding sites. Transcription factors affected are glucocorticoid responsive elements and E2F-myc cell cycle regulars. There are eleven common mutations that occur that affect the protein sequence itself. None of these mutations affect predicted post-translational modifications the protein sequence undergoes.

Disease association 
C18orf63 has been associated with personality disorders, obesity, and type two diabetes through a genome-wide association study. Currently research has not shown if C18orf63 plays a direct role in any of these diseases.

References 

Chromosomes
Proteins